Allen Case (born Alan Case Lavelle Jones, October 8, 1934 –  August 25, 1986) was an American television actor most noted for the lead role of Deputy Clay McCord in NBC-TV's The Deputy (1959–1961) opposite series regular Henry Fonda, who received top billing, but appeared far less frequently than Case.

Early years
Case was born in Dallas, Texas. His parents were retail clothiers Casey Jones and Nadine Allen Jones. He attended Southern Methodist University, but left in his junior year.

Career
After he left SMU, Case sang on a television program in Dallas, and then toured in musicals. Following those experiences, he traveled to New York to audition for the Arthur Godfrey's Talent Scouts program.

Case signed a contract with Columbia Records in 1955, and performed on the first studio cast recording of the Gershwins' musical Oh, Kay! He starred in his first Broadway show, Reuben, Reuben. He also toured with musicals, including South Pacific, Damn Yankees, and My Fair Lady.

In addition to starring in The Deputy, Case was one of the "friends" on Arthur Godfrey and His Friends.

Case made more than 30 television appearances between 1958 and 1982. Case made three guest appearances on the CBS courtroom drama series Perry Mason, including the role of defendant Adam Conrad in the 1964 episode, "The Case of the Ruinous Road".

In the 1965–1966 season, Case co-starred as Frank James with Christopher Jones in the ABC Western series The Legend of Jesse James.

He made a return to Broadway book musicals in 1967 as the third lead in Jule Styne and Arthur Laurents' Hallelujah, Baby!,  and his singing is featured prominently on the original cast album.

Buoyed by his role on The Deputy, Case made personal appearances. In 1961, he came to Shreveport, Louisiana, to appear on KWKH radio and at the rodeo, at which he played Johnny Horton's guitar.

In 1977, Case guest-starred on Quincy, M.E. in the second-season episode, "A Good Smack in the Mouth", as Stuart Harrison, the father of a runaway boy who crosses Quincy's path.

In 1981, Case played Harold Knitzer in The Life and Times of Eddie Roberts, a syndicated television drama.

Partial Television Appearances

Business activities
In the late 1960s, Case went into business manufacturing fur coats for men. Furs used in the coats included wolf, Norwegian seal, muskrat, and sheared rabbit. Prices ranged from $350 to $1,250. During his theatrical career, Case designed his own clothes, and as the menswear market changed, he thought the time was ripe to express his own ideas and designs.

Personal life
On September 22, 1961, Case married Bobbie Jones. They had a daughter, and they divorced on June 27, 1979.

Death
While on vacation, he died after suffering a heart attack in Truckee, California, at the age of 51.

Find A Grave Index-

References

External links

1934 births
1986 deaths
American male television actors
20th-century American male actors
Male actors from Dallas
Western (genre) television actors
American male musical theatre actors
20th-century American male singers
20th-century American singers